Nissinen is a Finnish surname. Notable people with the surname include:

Oskar Nissinen (1864–1937), Finnish politician
Tatu Nissinen (1883–1966), Finnish agronomist and politician
Lauri Nissinen (1918–1944), World War II flying ace in the Finnish Air Force
Martti Nissinen (born 1959), Finnish theologian and professor
Mikko Nissinen (born 1962), Finnish ballet dancer
Joni Nissinen (born 1991), Finnish football player

Finnish-language surnames